Rockcliffe may refer to:

Places

Canada 
 Rockcliffe Park, Ontario
 Rockcliffe-Smythe, a neighbourhood of Toronto

United Kingdom 
England
 Rockcliffe, Cumbria
 Rockcliffe, Lancashire
 Rockcliffe Cross, Cumbria

Scotland
 Rockcliffe, Dumfries and Galloway

Wales
 Rockcliffe, Flintshire, see List of places along Wales Coast Path

United States 
 Rockcliffe Mansion, in Hannibal, Missouri

Other uses 
 Rockcliffe Park Public School, in Rockcliffe Park, Ontario
 CFB Rockcliffe, a former Canadian Forces Base in Ottawa
 
 Ottawa/Rockcliffe Airport
 Rockcliffe Flying Club
 Rockcliffe railway station, in Cumbria, disused

See also

Rockcliff
Rockliff
Rockliffe